Olivier Delaître and Fabrice Santoro were the defending champions, but both players decided to rest after competing in the quarterfinals of the Davis Cup. However, Santoro competed in the singles tournament, losing in first round to Jiří Novák.

Jaime Oncins and Daniel Orsanic won the title by defeating Aleksandar Kitinov and Jack Waite 6–2, 6–1 in the final.

Seeds
All seeds received a bye into the second round.

Draw

Finals

Top half

Bottom half

References

External links
 Official results archive (ATP)
 Official results archive (ITF)

Mercedes Cupn - Doubles
Doubles 1999